Singles of the 90s is a compilation album by Swedish pop music group, Ace of Base.

Background
Singles of the 90s was released on November 15, 1999 in Europe, Asia, and Africa. The band had begun work on their fourth studio album (Da Capo), when they were approached by their label to put out a greatest hits release.  Jonas Berggren, the band's main composer, initially refused the offer, claiming the idea for a singles package was premature.  In the end, the band relented and offered three songs titled "Hallo Hallo", "C'est La Vie," and "Love in December", which was co-written by all four band members.

An American counterpart, Greatest Hits, was released the following year on April 18, 2000, and included only "C'est La Vie" of the three new tracks. This release included a track error at the beginning of "The Sign" and sold poorly. Singles of the 90s was released in the US via iTunes in 2007 despite the Greatest Hits release.

Track listing

Charts

Certifications

References

Ace of Base compilation albums
1999 greatest hits albums
Polydor Records compilation albums
Edel-Mega Records albums